Bratteli's Second Cabinet governed Norway between 16 October 1973 and 15 January 1976. The Labour Party cabinet was led by Trygve Bratteli.

Cabinet members 

|}

State Secretaries

References 
Trygve Brattelis andre regjering 1973-1976 - Regjeringen.no

Notes 

Bratteli 2
Bratteli 2
1973 establishments in Norway
1976 disestablishments in Norway
Cabinets established in 1973
Cabinets disestablished in 1976